Rome is an unincorporated community located in Sunflower County, Mississippi.

Government and infrastructure
The United States Postal Service operates the Rome Post Office. In July 2011 the USPS stated that it could possibly close the Rome Post Office.

Education
The City of Drew is served by the Sunflower County Consolidated School District. Elementary school students attend A. W. James Elementary School in Drew and middle school students attend Drew Hunter Middle School in Drew. High school students attend Thomas E. Edwards, Sr. High School (formerly Ruleville Central High School) in Ruleville.

Residents were previously zoned to the Drew School District. Children attended A.W. James Elementary School and Drew Hunter High School in Drew. Prior to the 2010-2011 school year the Drew School District secondary schools were Hunter Middle School and Drew High School. As of July 1, 2012, the Drew School District was consolidated with the Sunflower County School District. Drew Hunter's high school division closed as of that date, with high school students rezoned to Ruleville Central High School.

Mississippi Delta Community College has the Drew Center in Drew. Sunflower County Library System operates the Drew Public Library in Drew.

Gallery

References

Unincorporated communities in Sunflower County, Mississippi
Unincorporated communities in Mississippi